Claude Barrat ( 1658 –  1711) was a notary and a clerk of the court in Placentia (Plaisance), Newfoundland.

A census in 1691 confirms Barrat's presence in the New World and involved in the fishing industry at Saint-Pierre. In 1696, he was appointed notary and a clerk of the court in Placentia by Governor Jacques-François de Monbeton de Brouillan.

External links
Biography at the Dictionary of Canadian Biography Online

People from Troyes
1658 births
1711 deaths
Franco-Newfoundlander people